Pseudochrodes suturalis is a species of beetle in the family Silvanidae, the only species in the genus Pseudochrodes.

References

Silvanidae